Kevin Kline is an American actor of stage and screen.

Kline began his career on stage in 1972 with The Acting Company. He has gone on to win three Tony Awards for his work on Broadway, winning Best Featured Actor in a Musical for the 1978 original production of On the Twentieth Century, Best Actor in a Musical for the 1981 revival of The Pirates of Penzance. In 2003, he starred as Falstaff in the Broadway production of Henry IV, for which he won the Drama Desk Award for Outstanding Actor in a Play and was nominated for a Tony. In 2017 he won the Tony Award for Best Actor in a Play for the revival of Noël Coward's Present Laughter.

He made his film debut in Sophie's Choice (1982) starring opposite Meryl Streep. For his role in the 1988 comedy hit A Fish Called Wanda, he won the Academy Award for Best Supporting Actor. He is also known for his performances in the films The Big Chill (1983), Silverado (1985), Cry Freedom (1987), Grand Canyon (1991), Dave (1993), The Ice Storm (1997), In & Out (1997), Wild Wild West (1999), De-Lovely (2004), The Conspirator (2010), My Old Lady (2014), and Beauty and the Beast (2017). Kline has voiced characters in such films as The Hunchback of Notre Dame (1996), The Road to El Dorado (2000), The Tale of Despereaux (2008) and the animated comedy series Bob's Burgers (2011–present).

Screen

Film

Television

Video games 
 Disney's Animated Storybook: The Hunchback of Notre Dame - Captain Phoebus (voice)

Stage

Theatre

References 

Male actor filmographies
American filmographies